KOKB 1580 AM is a radio station licensed to Blackwell, Oklahoma. The station broadcasts a sports format and is owned by Team Radio, LLC.

Translators

References

External links
KOKB's website

OKB
Sports radio stations in the United States